Lalazar, is a tourist spot at an elevation of  above the sea level, located in upper Kaghan Valley in Mansehra District of Khyber Pakhtunkhwa Province of Pakistan.

See also
 Saiful Muluk Lake
 Lulusar Lake
 Naran

References

External links

Hill stations in Pakistan
Populated places in Mansehra District